Waldersbach is a commune in the Bas-Rhin department in Grand Est in north-eastern France.

Population

People
 Jean-Frédéric Oberlin lived here until his death in 1820.
 Anne Knight, an early British feminist and abolitionist, died here in 1862.

See also
 Communes of the Bas-Rhin department

References

Communes of Bas-Rhin
Bas-Rhin communes articles needing translation from French Wikipedia